Chevy Chase (born 1943) is an American comedian and actor.

Chevy Chase may also refer to:

Places
 Chevy Chase, Maryland, a suburb of Washington, D.C., comprising:
 Chevy Chase (town), Maryland, an incorporated town
 Chevy Chase (CDP), Maryland, a census-designated place
 Chevy Chase View, Maryland
 Chevy Chase Village, Maryland
 Chevy Chase Section Three
 Chevy Chase Section Five
 Martin's Additions, Maryland
 North Chevy Chase
 Chevy Chase (Washington, D.C.), a neighborhood of Washington, D.C., bordering Chevy Chase, Maryland
A parcel of hunting land (or chase) in the Cheviot Hills on the border of Scotland and England
 A shopping mall in the Eldon Square Shopping Centre, Newcastle upon Tyne named for the Cheviot Chase
 Chevy Chase, Lexington, a neighborhood in southeastern Lexington, Kentucky, United States

Other uses
 "The Ballad of Chevy Chase", a 16th-century ballad from the borderland between England and Scotland; the source of the term
Derived from the ballad, but usually spelled Chevy Chace, a variant name of the children's game Darebase
Chevy Chase Bank, formerly the largest bank in the Washington Metropolitan Area
Chevy Chase Arcade, listed on the National Register of Historic Places in Washington, D.C.
Avalon Theatre (Washington, D.C.), listed on the National Register of Historic Places in Washington, D.C.